Peter William Francis (born 1965) is an English-American art director and production designer. He was nominated for an Academy Award in the category Best Production Design for the film The Father.

Selected filmography 
 The Father (2020; co-nominated with Cathy Featherstone)

References

External links 

Living people
1965 births
People from Yorkshire
English emigrants to the United States
American art directors
American production designers
English art directors